Johny Placide (born 29 January 1988) is a professional footballer who plays as a goalkeeper for Ligue 2 club Bastia. Born in France, he plays for and captains the Haiti national team.

Club career
Placide began his career on youth side with Le Havre and was promoted to the first team in July 2008 and played four games in his first season. He played in his debut match on 26 April 2009 against Grenoble.

Placide joined Reims in January 2013. He made his league debut for the club on 19 January 2013 in a 1–0 away defeat to Sochaux. In July 2016, Placide was released from the club. He went on to play one season for Guingamp.

On 31 August 2017, Placide signed a two-year contract with League One side Oldham Athletic. On 26 September 2017, he made his debut for Oldham Athletic in a 3–2 victory over Peterborough United. He made several important saves and was awarded the man of the match award for his performance. On 3 October 2017, Placide earned his first clean sheet for Oldham Athletic in a 1–0 victory over Crewe Alexandra in the EFL Trophy. On 17 April 2018, he saved a key penalty from Rochdale's Joe Rafferty to help his side secure a 0–0 draw.

On 5 June 2021, Placide signed for newly-promoted Ligue 2 club Bastia.

International career
Placide played for the Haiti national team at the 2008 Olympic Qualifying Tournament, losing all three qualifying games, but was most fondly remembered for his performance against Mexico; despite losing 5–1, Placide had saved several clear opportunities from Mexico during the match, including a penalty. Despite Placide's heroics, this game eliminated both teams and cost Hugo Sánchez his post as national coach. Placide was then called to the French U21 side playing at the Toulon Tournament. He earned his first French U21 cap in a 1–0 victory over Portugal. Placide played his first game for the French U21 squad on 11 February 2009 against Tunisia.

Placide was called up by Haiti for the 2019 CONCACAF Gold Cup, in which his side won group B and made it to the semi-finals for the very first time, before being eliminated by Mexico.

Career statistics

Honours
Haiti
Caribbean Cup bronze: 20122014

References

External links

Johny Placide profile at FHF
 

Living people
1988 births
French sportspeople of Haitian descent
Citizens of Haiti through descent
People from Montfermeil
Footballers from Seine-Saint-Denis
Haitian footballers
French footballers
Association football goalkeepers
Haiti international footballers
France under-21 international footballers
2014 Caribbean Cup players
2015 CONCACAF Gold Cup players
Copa América Centenario players
2019 CONCACAF Gold Cup players
Ligue 1 players
Ligue 2 players
First Professional Football League (Bulgaria) players
Le Havre AC players
Stade de Reims players
En Avant Guingamp players
Oldham Athletic A.F.C. players
FC Tsarsko Selo Sofia players
SC Bastia players
Haitian expatriate footballers
Haitian expatriate sportspeople in England
Expatriate footballers in England
Haitian expatriate sportspeople in Bulgaria
Expatriate footballers in Bulgaria